Rhinoguinea is a monotypic genus of snakes in the family Leptotyphlopidae. It contains one species, Rhinoguinea magna. It is endemic to southern Mali.

References

Leptotyphlopidae
Snake genera